Ge with inverted breve (Г̑ г̑; italics: Г̑ г̑) is a letter of the Cyrillic script.

Ge with inverted breve is used in the Aleut language, where it represents the voiced uvular fricative . It corresponds to Latin letter G with circumflex (Ĝ ĝ Ĝ ĝ).

See also
Cyrillic characters in Unicode

Cyrillic letters with diacritics
Letters with breve